Pascoe Bioletti (fl. 1913–1914) was an English criminal who attempted to influence the results of English football games. Pascoe's son, William Alfred Bioletti, was operator of a football betting business in Geneva.

In 1913, Bioletti approached West Bromwich Albion F.C. and England captain Jesse Pennington and offered £5 per player for Albion to endeavour not to win their forthcoming game against Everton F.C. on 29 November.

Pennington alerted the police and after the game, which ended in a draw, he met Bioletti, ostensibly for the pay-off, at which point the police moved in to arrest Bioletti, who was convicted and sentenced to 5 months' imprisonment in 1914.

Bioletti is also reputed to have approached Birmingham City F.C. captain Frank Womack.

References

English criminals
English people of Italian descent
Match fixers
Year of birth unknown
Year of death unknown